William D. Clay Jr. is currently a special adviser to the United Nations.

Clay serves as a special adviser in the Division of Nutrition and Consumer Protection for the Food and Agriculture Organization of the United Nations. Clay, who resides in Rome, Italy, has visited and worked in more than 90 countries throughout his career.

He is a faculty member in Florida State University's College of Human Sciences, and has also taught courses on the International Politics of Hunger and Malnutrition for Florida State's interdisciplinary International Affairs program, with which he is loosely affiliated.

Education
Bachelor of Arts from Florida State University in 1971.
Master of Science from Florida State University in 1974.

References

External links
Clay's Biography
Additional info about Clay

Living people
Year of birth missing (living people)
American civil servants
Florida State University alumni